Mohammed Ibrahmi Shami (Arabic:محمد إبراهيم شامي) (born 30 September 1993) is a Qatari footballer who plays as a left back.

External links

References

Qatari footballers
1993 births
Living people
Al-Rayyan SC players
Al Kharaitiyat SC players
Lusail SC players
Qatar Stars League players
Qatari Second Division players
Association football fullbacks